Arianwen Parkes-Lockwood (born 24 July 1987) is an Australian actress and producer.

Early life
Arianwen lived in the small rural area of Black Mountain in the New England Region of New South Wales. She attended Newling Public School and Duval High School in Armidale.

Career
After graduating from the National Institute of Dramatic Art, Sydney, in 2008, Parkes-Lockwood played Abigail in The Crucible for the Sydney Theatre Company. She appeared as Dolly Green in the 2011 television series Underbelly: Razor; then in Tough Nuts (2011) and a BBC docudrama The Kangaroo Gang: Thieves by Appointment (2011).

She was a winner of the 2011 Marten Bequest Travelling Scholarship for acting and filmmaking.

In 2013, she was cast as Olivia Bligh in the Seven Network's 1950s period drama A Place to Call Home.

In 2015 she appeared as Harriet Edwards in ABC Television's Miss Fisher's Murder Mysteries.

In 2019, she appeared naked in a video for PETA's anti-wool campaign.

Personal life
Parkes-Lockwood is vegan.

References

External links

A Place to Call Home at the Internet Movie Database

Judges' Report 2011
at martenbequest.com.au
Trouble SOCIAL: The Martens 2011 at troublemag.com
Blake, Jason The Crucible The Sydney Morning Herald, 6 May 2009

1987 births
Living people
Australian stage actresses
Australian television actresses
Place of birth missing (living people)
National Institute of Dramatic Art alumni